Criconematidae is a family of nematodes belonging to the order Tylenchida.

Genera

Genera:
 Amphisbaenema Orton Williams, 1982
 Bakernema Wu, 1964
 Blandicephalanema Mehta & Raski, 1971

References

Nematodes